The Sunshine Coast Independent Schools Sports Association (SCISSA) was established in 2003 and provides a sporting competition for Independent schools on the Sunshine Coast, Queensland, Australia.

Schools

Current member schools

Sports

Current 

 AFL
 Basketball
 Netball
 Rugby Union
 Softball
 Touch Football
 Volleyball
 Water Polo

Carnivals
 Athletics
 Cross Country
 Swimming

See also 
 List of schools in Queensland

External links 
 Sunshine Coast Independent Schools Sports Association 

Australian school sports associations
Sport in the Sunshine Coast, Queensland